is a Japanese film and television actress active since 1997. Her first feature movie was Godzilla: Final Wars and first television show was Strawberry Night.

Filmography

Film

Television

References

External links
 
 Reika Kirishima Age on captionsnation.com

1972 births
Living people
Actors from Niigata Prefecture
Japanese film actresses
Japanese television actresses
20th-century Japanese actresses
21st-century Japanese actresses